The recordings of American jazz saxophonist Stan Getz from 1944 to 1991.

Discography

As leader/co-leader 
 1947: Opus de Bop (Savoy, 1977)
 1948: Groovin' High (Modern, 1956)
 1949–50: Stan Getz Quartets (Prestige, 1955)
 1951: Stan Getz at Storyville Vol. 1 with Jimmy Raney and Al Haig (Roost, 1955)
 1951: Stan Getz at Storyville Vol. 2 with Jimmy Raney and Al Haig (Roost, 1955)
 1949–52: The Brothers with Zoot Sims and Al Cohn (Prestige, 1956)
 1951–52: The Sound (Roost, 1955)
 1951–52: The Getz Age (Roost, 1955)
 1952: Stan Getz Plays (Norgran, 1955) – compiles the 10" LPs Stan Getz Plays (Clef MGC 137) and The Artistry of Stan Getz (Clef MGC 143).
 1949–53: Early Stan with Jimmy Raney (Prestige, 1963)
 1953: Norman Granz' Jam Session #3 (Norgran, 1953)
 1953: Norman Granz' Jam Session #4 (Norgran, 1953)
 1953: Diz and Getz (Norgran, 1955)
 1953: Interpretations by the Stan Getz Quintet (Norgran, 1954)
 1954: Stan Getz at The Shrine (Norgran, 1954) – live
 1955: Hamp and Getz (Norgran, 1955)
 1955: West Coast Jazz (Verve, 1955)
 1956: Interpretations by the Stan Getz Quintet #3 (Norgran, 1956)
 1956: Stan Getz in Stockholm (Verve, 1956)
 1956: For Musicians Only with Dizzy Gillespie and Sonny Stitt (Verve, 1958)
 1956: The Steamer (Verve, 1956)
 1957: Stan Getz and the Cool Sounds (Verve, 1957)
 1957: The Soft Swing (Verve, 1957)
 1957: Jazz Giants '58 with Gerry Mulligan, Harry Edison, Louis Bellson and the Oscar Peterson Trio (Verve, 1957)
 1957: Award Winner: Stan Getz (Verve, 1957)
 1957: Stan Getz and the Oscar Peterson Trio (Verve, 1957)
 1957: Gerry Mulligan Meets Stan Getz (Verve, 1957) – also released as Getz Meets Mulligan in Hi–Fi
 1957: Stan Getz and J. J. Johnson at the Opera House (Verve, 1957)
 1958: Cal Tjader-Stan Getz Sextet (Fantasy, 1958)
 1958: Stan Meets Chet (Verve, 1958)
 1958: Les Tricheurs (Barclay, 1958) 
 1958: Imported from Europe (Verve, 1958)
 1958: Stan Getz Live in Europe 1958 (Jazz Anthology, 1982)
 1958: Stockholm Sessions '58 (Dragon, 1988)
 1960: Cool Velvet (Verve, 1960)
 1960: Getz in Poland (Musa, 1960)
 1960: Stan Getz at Large (Verve, 1960) – live
 1961: Focus (Verve, 1962)
 1961: Recorded Fall 1961 with Bob Brookmeyer (Verve, 1961)
 1962: Jazz Samba with Charlie Byrd (Verve, 1962)
 1962: Big Band Bossa Nova with Gary McFarland Orchestra (Verve, 1962)
 1963: Jazz Samba Encore! with Luiz Bonfá (Verve, 1963)
 1963: Getz/Gilberto with João Gilberto (Verve, 1964)
 1963: Stan Getz with Guest Artist Laurindo Almeida (Verve, 1963)
 1963: Reflections (Verve, 1964)
 1964: Live In London (Harkit, 1964)
 1964: Getz Au Go Go with Astrud Gilberto (Verve, 1964) – live
 1964: Getz/Gilberto Vol. 2 with João Gilberto (Verve, 1967)
 1964: Stan Getz & Bill Evans (Verve, 1988)
 1965: The Canadian Concert of Stan Getz (Vancouver Concert) (Can-Am, 1965)
 1965: Stan Getz Plays Music from the Soundtrack of Mickey One (MGM, 1965) – soundtrack
 1966: Two Sides of Stan Getz (Unique Jazz, 1966)
 1966: The Stan Getz Quartet in Paris (Verve, 1967) – live
 1966: Voices (Verve, 1967)
 1967?: Stan Getz & Arthur Fiedler at Tanglewood with Arthur Fiedler (RCA Victor, 1967) – live
 1967: Sweet Rain (Verve, 1967)
 1966–68:What the World Needs Now: Stan Getz Plays Burt Bacharach and Hal David (Verve, 1968)
 1969: Didn't We (Verve, 1969)
 1969: Marrakesh Express (MGM, 1970)
 1971: Dynasty (Verve, 1971) – live
 1971: Change of Scenes with the Kenny Clarke/Francy Boland Big Band (Verve, 1971)
 1971: Communications '72 (Verve, 1972)
 1972: Captain Marvel (Columbia, 1974)
 1972: Stan Getz Quartet at Montreux (Polydor, 1977) – live
 1974: Jazz Jamboree '74 Vol. 2 (Polskie Nagrania Muza, 1974) – split album with McCoy Tyner Quartet
 1975: Stan Getz My Foolish Heart Live at the Left Bank, Baltimore (Label M, 2000) – live
 1975: The Peacocks with Jimmie Rowles (Columbia, 1977)
 1975: The Master (Columbia, 1982)
 1975: The Best of Two Worlds with João Gilberto (Columbia, 1976)
 1977: Live at Montmartre (SteepleChase, 1977) – live
 1977: Another World (Columbia, 1978)
 1977: Mort d'un Pourri (Melba, 1977) – soundtrack to Death of a Corrupt Man
 1978: Academy of Jazz with Bob Brookmeyer (PolJazz, 1978)
 1978: Jazzbühne Berlin '78 (Repertoire, 1991) – live
 1978: Children of the World (Columbia, 1979)
 1979: Forest Eyes (CBS, 1980)
 1980: Midem Live '80 (Personal Choice, 1980) – live
 1980: The Great Jazz Gala '80 (Bellaphon, 1980)
 1981: The Dolphin (Concord Jazz, 1981) – live
 1981: Billy Highstreet Samba (EmArcy, 1990)
 1982: Pure Getz (Concord Jazz, 1982)
 1983: Poetry with Albert Dailey (Elektra Musician, 1984)
 1983: Line for Lyons with Chet Baker (Sonet, 1983) – live
 1983: The Stockholm Concert (Sonet, 1989) – live
 1986: Voyage (Black Hawk, 1986)
 1987: Anniversary! (EmArcy, 1989) – live
 1987: Serenity (EmArcy, 1991)
 1989: Homage to Charlie Parker (A&M, 1990) – as The Paris All-Stars
 1990?: Apasionado (A&M, 1990)

Posthumous releases 
 People Time with Kenny Barron (EmArcy, 1992)[2CD] – rec. 1991
 Spring Is Here (Concord Jazz, 1992) – rec. 1981
 Nobody Else But Me (Verve, 1994) – rec. 1964
 Blue Skies (Concord Jazz, 1995) – rec. 1982
 Stan Getz with European Friends (Denon, 1996) – rec. 1959–71
 The Song Is You (Laserlight, 1996) – rec. 1969
 Stan Getz Quartet Live in Paris (Dreyfus, 1996) – live rec. 1982
 Yours and Mine (Concord Jazz, 1996) – rec. 1989
 But Beautiful with Bill Evans (Milestone, 1996) – live rec. 1974
 West Coast Live with Chet Baker (Pacific Jazz, 1997) – rec. 1953–54
 Soul Eyes (Concord Jazz, 1997) – live rec. 1989 at the Glasgow International Jazz Festival and Musikhuset Aarhus
 The Stockholm Concerts with Chet Baker (Verve, 1998) – rec. 1983
 Quintessence Volume 1 with Chet Baker (Concord Jazz, 1998) – rec. 1983
 Quintessence Volume 2 with Chet Baker (Concord Jazz, 2000) – rec. 1983
 The Final Concert Recording (Eagle Jazz, 2000)[2CD] – live rec. 1990 at the Munich Philharmonic
 Bossas & Ballads – The Lost Sessions (Verve, 2003) – rec. 1989
 Live In London Volume 2 (Harkit, 2004) – live rec. 1964
 People Time: The Complete Recordings with Kenny Barron (EmArcy, 2009) – live rec. 1991
 Stan Getz Quartet Live At Montreux 1972 (Eagle Rock Entertainment, 2013) – live rec. 1972. Also released in Europe as Stan Getz Quartet Live In Europe 1972.
 Getz/Gilberto '76 with João Gilberto (Resonance, 2016) – live rec. 1976
 Moments in Time (Resonance, 2016) – live rec. 1976 at San Francisco's Keystone Korner
 Getz at the Gate (Verve, 2019) – live rec. 1961 at the Village Gate
 Live At The Berlin Jazztage 1966 with Astrud Gilberto (The Lost Recordings, 2021)[2CD] – live rec. 1966 at The Berlin Jazztage

Live jam sessions with various artists 
 The JATP All-Stars at the Opera House (Verve, 1957)
 Norman Granz Presents Jazz at the Philharmonic in Europe Vol. 1 (Verve, 1960)
 Norman Granz Presents Jazz at the Philharmonic in Europe Vol. 2 (Verve, 1960)
 Norman Granz Presents Jazz at the Philharmonic in Europe Vol. 4 (Verve, 1960)
 Jazz at the Santa Monica Civic '72 (Pablo, 1972)
 Newport in New York '72: The Jam Sessions, Vol. 1 and 2 (Cobblestone, 1972)
 Montreux Summit Volume 1 (Columbia, 1977)
 Montreux Summit Volume 2 (Columbia, 1977)
 Havana Jam with the CBS Jazz All Stars (Columbia, 1979)
 Havana Jam II with the CBS Jazz All Stars (Columbia, 1979)
 All Star Jam Session (Eastworld, 1981) – at Aurex Jazz Festival '81
 Live Special (Eastworld, 1981) – at Aurex Jazz Festival '81

Compilations 
 Conception (Prestige, 1956)
 Stan Getz and the Cool Sounds (Verve, 1957)
 The World of Stan Getz (Verve, 1962)
 The Melodic Stan Getz (Metro, 1965)
 Prezervation with Al Haig (Prestige, 1967) – rec. 1949–50
 Return Engagement (Verve, 1974)
 The Best of Stan Getz (Columbia, 1980)
 Stan the Man (Verve, 1984) – rec. 1952–61 
 The Lyrical Stan Getz (Columbia, 1988) 
 The Artistry Of Stan Getz: The Best of The Verve Years Volume 1 (Verve, 1991)
 The Artistry Of Stan Getz: The Best of The Verve Years Volume 2 (Verve, 1993)
 Jazz 'Round Midnight:  Stan Getz (Verve, 1993)
 A Life In Jazz: A Musical Biography (Verve, 1996)
 The Complete Roost Recordings (Blue Note, 1997)
  My Old Flame  (Concord Jazz, 2001) – rec. 1981. reissue of The Dolphin and Spring Is Here  
 Café Montmartre (Universal France, 2002)
 The Very Best of Stan Getz (Verve, 2002)
 The Complete Columbia Albums Collection (Columbia, 2011)[8CD]

As sideman 

With Ella Fitzgerald
 1957: Like Someone in Love (Verve, 1957)
 1957: At the Opera House (Verve, 1958) – live

With Woody Herman
 1947: Twelve Shades of Blue (Columbia, 1955)
 1948: The Thundering Herds (Columbia, 1961)
 1976: The 40th Anniversary, Carnegie Hall Concert (RCA Victor, 1977)
 1979: Woody and Friends (Concord Jazz, 1981)
 1981: Live At The Concord Jazz Festival (Concord Jazz, 1982) – live

With Diane Schuur
 Deedles (GRP, 1984)
 Schuur Thing (GRP, 1985)
 Timeless (GRP, 1986) – live

With others
 Herb Alpert, Midnight Sun (A&M, 1992) – rec. 1989
 Chet Baker, Seven Faces of Valentine (Philology, 1990) – rec. 1975–85
 Count Basie and Sarah Vaughan, Echoes of an Era: Basie, Getz and Vaughan Live at Birdland (Roulette, 1975) – live rec. 1956
 Dee Bell, Let There Be Love (Concord Jazz, 1983)
 Tony Bennett, Jazz (Columbia, 1987) – rec. 1964
 Buddy Bregman, Swinging Kicks (Verve, 1956)
 Bob Brookmeyer, Bob Brookmeyer and Friends (Columbia, 1965) – rec. 1964
 Herb Ellis, Nothing but the Blues (Verve, 1957)
 Everything but the Girl, The Language of Life (Atlantic, 1990) – rec. 1989
 Dizzy Gillespie, Sittin' In (Verve, 1957)
 Benny Goodman, The Benny Goodman Story (Decca, 1955)
 Jimmy Gourley, Good News (Bloomdido, 1981)
 Michele Hendricks, Carryin' On (Muse, 1987)
 Huey Lewis and the News, Small World (Chrysalis, 1988) – rec. 1987–88
 Peter Herbolzheimer, Jazz Gala Concert (Atlantic, 1976)
 Kimiko Kasai, This Is My Love (CBS/Sony, 1975)
 Stan Kenton, Stan Kenton Classics (Capitol, 1952) – rec. 1944–47
 John Lewis, The Modern Jazz Society Presents a Concert of Contemporary Music (Norgran, 1955)
 Abbey Lincoln, You Gotta Pay the Band (Verve, 1991)
 Michael McDonald, Take It to Heart (Reprise, 1990) – rec. 1989
 The Manhattan Transfer, Brasil (Atlantic, 1987) – 1 track
 Barry Manilow, Swing Street (Arista, 1987)
 Helen Merrill, Just Friends (EmArcy, 1989)
 Annie Ross, Gypsy (World Pacific, 1958)
 Cybill Shepherd, Mad About the Boy (Inner City, 1976)
 Johnny Smith, Moonlight in Vermont (Roost, 1956) – rec. 1952–53

External links
Discogs entry

References 

Bossa nova discographies
Jazz discographies
Discographies of American artists